Mount McNair is a  mountain summit located in British Columbia, Canada.

Description
Mount McNair is part of the Lillooet Ranges of the Coast Mountains. Precipitation runoff from the peak drains to Harrison Lake via Talc and Bear creeks, and from Garnet Creek to the Fraser River.

Etymology
The mountain's toponym was officially adopted April 7, 1955, by the Geographical Names Board of Canada. The mountain is named after Royal Canadian Air Force Flight Sergeant Nathaniel Wesley McNair (1917–1943), from Chilliwack. He was serving with 460 (RAAF) Squadron when he was killed in action November 26, 1943, age 26. McNair perished during a raid against Berlin when his Avro Lancaster crashed during WWII in Europe.

Climate

Based on the Köppen climate classification, Mount McNair is located in a subarctic climate zone of western North America. Most weather fronts originate in the Pacific Ocean, and travel east toward the Coast Mountains where they are forced upward by the range (Orographic lift), causing them to drop their moisture in the form of rain or snowfall. As a result, the Coast Mountains experience high precipitation, especially during the winter months in the form of snowfall. Winter temperatures can drop below −20 °C with wind chill factors below −30 °C.

See also

 Geography of British Columbia

References

External links
 Nathaniel Wesley McNair (photos): Canadian Virtual War Memorial 
 Weather: Mount McNair

One-thousanders of British Columbia
Pacific Ranges
Yale Division Yale Land District
Coast Mountains